Roy Emerson and Neale Fraser were the defending champions, but lost in the quarterfinals to Mike Davies and Bobby Wilson.

Rafael Osuna and Dennis Ralston defeated Davies and Wilson in the final, 7–5, 6–3, 10–8 to win the gentlemen's doubles tennis title at the 1960 Wimbledon Championship.

Seeds

  Roy Emerson /  Neale Fraser (quarterfinals)
  Rod Laver /  Bob Mark (semifinals)
  José Luis Arilla /  Andrés Gimeno (first round)
  Nicola Pietrangeli /  Orlando Sirola (second round)

Draw

Finals

Top half

Section 1

Section 2

Bottom half

Section 3

Section 4

References

External links

Men's Doubles
Wimbledon Championship by year – Men's doubles